The 2013 Kansas Collegiate Athletic Conference football season is made up of 10 United States college athletic programs that compete in the Kansas Collegiate Athletic Conference (KCAC) under the National Association of Intercollegiate Athletics (NAIA) for the 2013 college football season.  The season began play on August 31, 2013.

Conference teams and information
Conference rules require each team to play all other teams within the conference and two other regular season non-conference game for a total of 11 games.  Up until 2011, the conference only allowed a 10-game season.

Two teams begin the season with new head coaches.  Bethel's current coach is Martin Mathis.  Mathis replaces James Dotson, who took over the role for one season after the sudden resignation of Travis Graber on July 27, 2012.
 
Bethany's Manny Matsakis is also new to his team and a first-year head coach.  Matsakis was announced as the new head coach for the Swedes in March 2013 to replace Jamie Cruce after his resignation.

Preseason outlook
The 2013 NAIA football rankings released their annual spring poll on April 15, 2013.  Two teams from the conference were ranked in the top 25:  #16 Ottawa and #19 Tabor.  A third team, Kansas Wesleyan, received votes in the poll.  The poll rankings changed slightly with the Preseason Poll on August 12, 2013:  Tabor was ranked ahead of Ottawa at 17th and 18th.  Kansas Weleyan did not receive any votes, but Friends managed to receive nine.

Schedule
The season is scheduled to begin play on August 31, 2013.  The schedule is subject to change.

Week 0

Week 1

Week 2

The week of September 14 marks the first Kansas Collegiate Athletic Conference – Heart of America Athletic Conference Football Series.  During this week, head-to-head matchups are played from teams in the KCAC versus the Heart of America Athletic Conference.  Matchups are based on the final standings of the 2012 season (see 2012 Kansas Collegiate Athletic Conference football season and 2012 Heart of America Athletic Conference football season).

Week 3

Week 4

Week 5

Week 6

Week 7

Week 8

Week 9

Week 10

Week 11

See also
List of Kansas Wesleyan Coyotes head football coaches

References

Kansas Collegiate Athletic Conference
Kansas Collegiate Athletic Conference football seasons
Kansas